The 2015 Mobil 1 SportsCar Grand Prix presented by Hawk Performance was a professional sports car racing event held at Canadian Tire Motorsport Park near Bowmanville, Ontario on July 12, 2015. The race was the seventh round of the 2015 United SportsCar Championship season and the event marked the 30th IMSA sanctioned sports car race held at the facility.

Race background
For 2015, the Tudor Championship race featured the Prototype (P) and GT Le Mans (GTLM) classes alongside the Prototype Challenge (PC) class which replaced the GT Daytona (GTD) class which competed at the 2014 edition of the Grand Prix.

The weekend also included races for the Continental Tire SportsCar Challenge, Cooper Tires Prototype Lites, Porsche GT3 Cup Challenge USA, and the Mazda MX-5 Cup.

Report

Race summary
The race was won overall by Jordan Taylor and Ricky Taylor, driving a Corvette Daytona Prototype for Wayne Taylor Racing. They finished just ahead of a similar car driven by Action Express Racing pairing Dane Cameron and Eric Curran, while the podium was completed by the Ligier JS P2 of Michael Shank Racing, driven by Oswaldo Negri Jr. and John Pew. In eighth place overall, CORE Autosport won the Prototype Challenge class with drivers Jon Bennett and Colin Braun, while the GT Le Mans honors were taken by Porsche North America – run by CORE Autosport – in twelfth place overall, with a Porsche 911 RSR driven by Patrick Pilet and Nick Tandy.

Race results

Media

Television
The race was broadcast live by Fox Sports on Fox Sports 1 in the United States and on Fox Sports Racing in Canada, Puerto Rico and the Caribbean. The event was televised internationally by Motors TV in Europe and Network Ten in Australia.

Radio
The race was broadcast by IMSA Radio with announcers John Hindhaugh and Jeremy Shaw calling the race on IMSA.tv and radiolemans.com, which was simulcast on Sirius channel 117 satellite radio and on 90.7 FM at the track.

Support race results

References

External links
 Mobil 1 SportsCar Grand Prix official website
 IMSA.com Canadian Tire Motorsport Park event page
 
 IMSA Radio 2015 SportsCar Grand Prix Race Broadcast

2015 in Canadian motorsport
2015 United SportsCar Championship season
SportsCar Grand Prix
2015